Eric Boguniecki (born May 6, 1975) is an American former National Hockey League player.

Playing career 
As a youth, Boguniecki played in the 1989 Quebec International Pee-Wee Hockey Tournament with the New York Islanders minor ice hockey team.

Drafted 193rd overall in the 1993 NHL Entry Draft by the St. Louis Blues, Boguniecki's scoring ability in the minor leagues led to him being signed as a free agent by the Florida Panthers in 1999.  He played just 4 games for the Panthers before returning to St. Louis in a trade also involving Andrej Podkonický.

A tough grinding forward, Boguniecki stands out on the ice due to his height; Boguniecki stands 5 feet 8 inches.  He established himself in the NHL in the 2002–03 season, accumulating 49 points in 80 games.  During the 2004–05 NHL lockout, Boguniecki played for the AHL's Worcester IceCats.  A winner of the Les Cunningham award as the AHL's most valuable player in 2001-02, Eric Boguniecki is currently the only other American born player to win this award since Eddie Olson (1952–53).

In December 2005, Boguniecki was traded to Pittsburgh Penguins scoring 6 goals and 10 assists before being signed by the Columbus Blue Jackets. He played for their AHL affiliate, the Syracuse Crunch, before being traded to the New York Islanders on October 25, 2006. He played 11 games in the 06–07 season and had no points and his plus/minus was even. He had 8 PIM. He played for the Islanders affiliate AHL team the Bridgeport Sound Tigers and had 23 goals and 32 assists in 48 games.

For the 2007–08 season, Boguniecki played for the German DEL Team ERC Ingolstadt. On July 22, 2008, Boguniecki signed a one-year contract with the Anaheim Ducks. In the 2008-09 season, Eric was assigned to Ducks affiliate, the Iowa Chops, where he scored 34 points in 69 games.

On October 29, 2009, he signed with the ECHL's Alaska Aces.

Coaching career
On July 12, 2011, Boguniecki was named the assistant coach of the Bridgeport Sound Tigers.

Career statistics

Regular season and playoffs

International

Awards and honors

References

External links
 
 

1975 births
Alaska Aces (ECHL) players
American men's ice hockey centers
Bridgeport Sound Tigers players
ERC Ingolstadt players
Florida Panthers players
Fort Wayne Komets players
Ice hockey coaches from Connecticut
Iowa Stars players
Living people
Louisville Panthers players
New Hampshire Wildcats men's ice hockey players
New York Islanders players
Peoria Rivermen (AHL) players
Pittsburgh Penguins players
St. Louis Blues draft picks
St. Louis Blues players
Syracuse Crunch players
Westminster School (Connecticut) alumni
Worcester IceCats players
Ice hockey people from New Haven, Connecticut